John Fabuar Ceniza (born 7 February 1998) is a Filipino weightlifter. He represented the Philippines at the 2019 World Weightlifting Championships, as well as the 2019 Asian Championships.

Ceniza is also a silver medalist in the men's 55kg category event of the 2019 Southeast Asian Games.

At the Roma 2020 Weightlifting World Cup, he won a bronze medal in the men's 61 kg category.

Major results

References 

Living people
1998 births
Filipino male weightlifters
Southeast Asian Games medalists in weightlifting
Southeast Asian Games silver medalists for the Philippines
21st-century Filipino people